Stephanie Hyam is a British actress and artist, notable for stage work including The James Plays (2014, Edinburgh International Festival and Royal National Theatre) and film and TV appearances including Their Finest (2017), Doctor Who (2017: "The Pilot" and "The Doctor Falls"), Peaky Blinders (2016), Sherlock (2016: "The Abominable Bride"), Jekyll and Hyde (2015), and Bodyguard (2018). She is a graduate of Mountview Academy of Theatre Arts.

Filmography

Films

Television

References

External links

Living people
British actresses
Year of birth missing (living people)
21st-century British actresses
British film actresses
British stage actresses
British television actresses